The Poll Diaries is a 2010 German drama film directed by Chris Kraus. The Poll Diaries was the most expensive film that had ever been made in Estonia at the time. Later, Truth and Justice (2019) became the most expensive Estonian film with a budget of 2.5 million euros.

Cast
 Paula Beer as Oda von Siering
 Edgar Selge as Ebbo von Siering
 Tambet Tuisk as Schnaps
 Jeanette Hain as Milla von Siering
 Richy Müller as Mechmershausen
 Enno Trebs as Paul von Siering
 Yevgeni Sitokhin as Hauptmann Karpow
 Susi Stach as Gudrun Koskull
 Erwin Steinhauer as Professor Plötz
 Michael Kreihsl as Professor Hasenreich
 Gudrun Ritter as Oda Schaefer

References

External links
 

2010 films
2010 drama films
German drama films
2010s German-language films
Films set in Estonia
Films set in the 1910s
Films set in 1914
2010s German films